Jörg Hartmann Freiherr von und zu der Tann-Rathsamhausen (born 30 June 1943 in Villingen), known as Hartmann von der Tann, is a German radio and television journalist.

Life 
From 1966 to 1972, Tann studied at the University of Würzburg.

He worked as a journalist for German broadcaster ARD. As correspondent, Tann worked for ARD in Mexico and countries in South America. As sport reporter he worked for ARD at horse sport events.

Awards 
 1998: Telestar

References

Notes

External links

Sueddeutsche.de: Brandbrief für die Freiheit älterer Männer (German)
Presseportal.de: Das Erste, Hartmann von der Tann geht – Thomas Baumann kommt, Zum 1. Juli wechselt der ARD-Chefredakteur in der Programmdirektion, 29 June 2006
Phoenix.de: Hartmann von der Tann

1943 births
Living people
People from Villingen-Schwenningen
People from the Republic of Baden
German sports journalists
German sports broadcasters
20th-century German journalists
21st-century German journalists
German television reporters and correspondents
ARD (broadcaster) people